Medora Junior-Senior High School is a public middle school and high school located in Medora, Indiana.

The school's basketball team is the subject of the 2013 documentary Medora.

See also
 List of high schools in Indiana

References

External links
 Official Website

Public high schools in Indiana
Buildings and structures in Jackson County, Indiana